Zarvand (also Romanized as Zarwand) is a village in Taghenkoh-e Jonubi Rural District, Taghenkoh District, Firuzeh County, Razavi Khorasan Province, Iran. At the 2006 census, its population was 235, in 63 families.

References 

Populated places in Firuzeh County